Victor Uchevatov (born February 10, 1983 in Angarsk, Russia) is a Russian former professional ice hockey player. He was drafted in the 2nd round of the 2001 NHL entry draft by the New Jersey Devils.

Career
After being drafted by New Jersey in 2001, Uchevatov would play in the AHL for 6 years, getting 17 points in 269 games. He played for the Albany River Rats, the San Antonio Rampage, the Rochester Americans, and the Milwaukee Admirals. In 2004, Uchevatov was traded with Christian Berglund to the Florida Panthers in exchange for Viktor Kozlov.

After spending parts of the 2005-06 season playing for Severstal Cherepovets in Russia on a loan deal, Uchevatov returned to Russia for the 2007-08 season, where he would play for Yermak Angarsk. Uchevatov would play 4 seasons with the club, retiring in 2012.

International
Uchevatov represented Russia at the 2001 World Juniors U-18, where he would win a gold medal.

Career statistics

Regular season and playoffs

International

References
Victor Uchevatov Hockey Stats and Profile at hockeydb.com
Viktor Uchevatov at eliteprospects.com

1983 births
Living people
Russian ice hockey defencemen
San Antonio Rampage players
New Jersey Devils draft picks
People from Angarsk
Sportspeople from Irkutsk Oblast